Bitiya Hamaray Zamanay Main (English: Daughter, in our days) is a 2016 Pakistani comedy drama telefilm directed by Azfar Ali, written by Mansoor Saeed, produced by Abdullah Kadwani and Asad Qureshi under the 7th Sky Entertainment banner. The serial stars Ushna Shah, Javeria Abbasi and Wahaj Ali and was released in August 2016.

Synopsis 
Bitiya Humare Zamane Ki is a romantic comedy film which tells the story of three mothers who all have different aims for their children. One of them wants to get her son married while the other has recently got his son married. The third is a stepmother of Iraj (Ushna Shah) and since the start they both have had their differences and disagreements. Iraj falls in love with Fahad (Wahaj Ali) who is the only son of his parents. Fahad's mother is overly possessive about his son and wants to find him the best bride. During engagement and wedding preparations, many misunderstanding and disagreements happen. Amidst family pressures Fahad and Iraj come closer and part ways.

Cast 

 Ushna Shah as Iraj
 Wahaj Ali as Fahad
 Javeria Abbasi
 Rubina Ashraf
 Fariya Hassan as Ushna
 Farhan Ali Agha

References

External links

Pakistani television films